Manpreet Singh  (born 3 May 1985) is an amateur boxer from India and a product of Army Sports Institute. He competes in 82 – 91 kg category. Manpreet won silver medal in 2010 Asian Games held in Guangzhou, China. He was defeated by Mohammad Ghossoun of Syria in the gold medal bout by a score of 8:1.

References 

Indian male boxers
Boxers at the 2010 Commonwealth Games
Living people
Asian Games silver medalists for India
1985 births
Asian Games medalists in boxing
Boxers at the 2010 Asian Games
Medalists at the 2010 Asian Games
Place of birth missing (living people)
Commonwealth Games competitors for India
Heavyweight boxers